The 2016–17 Samford Bulldogs men's basketball team represented Samford University during the 2016–17 NCAA Division I men's basketball season. The Bulldogs, led by third-year head coach Scott Padgett, played their home games at the Pete Hanna Center in Homewood, Alabama as members of the Southern Conference. They finished the season 20–16, 8–10 in SoCon play to finish in seventh place. They defeated VMI in the first round of the SoCon tournament before losing in the quarterfinals to Furman. They were invited to the CollegeInsider.com Tournament where they defeated Canisius in the first round before losing in the second round to Liberty.

Previous season
The Bulldogs finished the 2015–16 season 14–19, 4–14 in SoCon play to finish in a tie for eighth place. They defeated VMI in the first round of the SoCon tournament to advance to the Quarterfinals where they lost to Chattanooga.

Roster

Schedule

|-
!colspan=9 style="background:#ca1009; color:#14295e;"| Non-conference regular season

|-
!colspan=9 style="background:#ca1009; color:#14295e;"| SoCon regular season

|-
!colspan=9 style="background:#ca1009; color:#14295e;"| SoCon tournament

|-
!colspan=9 style="background:#ca1009; color:#14295e;"| CIT

References

Samford Bulldogs men's basketball seasons
Samford
Samford
Samford
Samford